The SWAC Championship Game, officially the Cricket Wireless SWAC Championship Game, is an American college football game that is held annually on the first Saturday in December by the Southwestern Athletic Conference (SWAC) to determine its football champion. The game pits the champion of the Eastern Division against the champion of the Western Division in a game that follows the conclusion of the regular season. From 2015 onward, the winner of the game has represented the SWAC in the Celebration Bowl. As of the 2019 season, the game is sponsored by Cricket Wireless.

The game was held at Legion Field in Birmingham, Alabama, from 1999 through 2012, and moved to NRG Stadium in Houston, Texas, for the 2013 through 2017 playings. Since 2018, the game has been played at a campus site, hosted by the participant with the higher ranking, with the exception of the 2021 spring game when the championship moved to its third neutral location at the Mississippi Veterans Memorial Stadium in Jackson, Mississippi due to the COVID-19 pandemic.

History
Following the 1998 season, the SWAC announced that the league would be split into two divisions with the divisional winners meeting in a championship game. At the time of the announcement, a site for the game had not been selected but the Louisiana Superdome in New Orleans, the Astrodome in Houston, the Georgia Dome in Atlanta, Mississippi Veterans Memorial Stadium in Jackson, Ladd–Peebles Stadium in Mobile and Legion Field in Birmingham were each mentioned as potential locations for the event. Additionally, expansion of the league to twelve teams was also under consideration with Tennessee State, Florida A&M, Tuskegee and Morris Brown mentioned as possible additions. In February 1999, a championship game was officially approved by the SWAC Council of Presidents. Officials also stated the winner of the championship game would advance to play in the Heritage Bowl against an opponent from the Mid-Eastern Athletic Conference (MEAC).

The following May, SWAC officials announced the league offices would move from New Orleans to Birmingham and that the championship game would be played at Legion Field. Birmingham was selected over New Orleans, Houston, Baton Rouge and Memphis as the city guaranteed both free office space to house the league headquarters and free access to Legion Field to host the game. The inaugural game was played on December 11, with Southern defeating Jackson State 31–30 before 47,621 fans at Legion Field. The following week, Southern lost to Hampton in the Heritage Bowl; however, the meeting would be the only one for the SWAC champion following the championship game. In January 2000 the NCAA ruled schools cannot compete in two postseason games, effectively ending participation in the Heritage Bowl by the SWAC champion. With the SWAC left unable to compete, the Heritage Bowl folded in February 2000.

In July 2010, commissioner Duer Sharp announced the SWAC was interested in participating in the Legacy Bowl against the MEAC to determine the annual black college football national championship. Although a decision regarding the contest was postponed to 2011, SWAC participation in the event would potentially end the annual championship game in Birmingham. Ultimately, the SWAC championship game was retained, and in May 2013, SWAC officials announced a move from Legion Field to Reliant Stadium in Houston, Texas starting with the December 2013 playing.

In June 2017, the SWAC announced that it would end its football championship game following that season's contest, and would send its regular season champion to the Celebration Bowl from 2018 onward. In June 2018, the league reversed course, announcing that a championship game would be played in Birmingham. In November 2018, the league further advised that the championship game would be played at the “SWAC institution with the highest ranking.”  The December 2018 game was held at Jack Spinks Stadium in Lorman, Mississippi, home field of the Alcorn State Braves; the December 2019 game returns to the same venue. The 2021 Spring SWAC Championship football game was moved to the Mississippi Veterans Memorial Stadium, setting the game back up to its original format, at a neutral football stadium. The 2021 SWAC Championship for the fall season will go back to a campus site.

Team selection
When the game was initially proposed, the teams playing in the championship game was to include those with the best record against seven conference opponents from each division. However in August 1999 league officials changed the rule. For the inaugural contest, participation in the championship game was based on the record against the four divisional opponents only, not all conference teams. This format was dropped by the SWAC following the 1999 championship game in favor of the original proposal based on all league games, not only the divisional opponents.

Divisions

Eastern Division
Alabama A&M Bulldogs
Alabama State Hornets
Bethune–Cookman Wildcats
Florida A&M Rattlers
Jackson State Tigers
Mississippi Valley State Delta Devils

Western Division
Alcorn State Braves
Arkansas–Pine Bluff Golden Lions
Grambling State Tigers
Prairie View A&M Panthers
Southern Jaguars
Texas Southern Tigers

Results

 Texas Southern vacated its 2010 Championship victory, along with all its 2006 to 2010 wins, to avoid the NCAA imposing an athletics Death Penalty.

 The 2020 season spanned the fall of 2020 and spring of 2021, with the championship game played on May 1, 2021.

Results by team
Updated for December 2022; 23 editions played, 46 total appearances.

Championship years appear in bold type.

 Texas Southern vacated its 2010 championship game victory.

Previous SWAC champions

Prior to splitting into divisions and using a postseason championship game to decide its overall champion, the SWAC determined its champions by winning-percentage against conference opponents in regular season play.

In 1933 Langston appeared to win the title outright with a 4-0 conference record after the regular season, while Wiley finished 4-1, and Prairie View A&M finished 3-1. Langston was invited to the Prairie View Bowl, which was won by Prairie View. The Panthers subsequently declared themselves SWAC champions even though their claim was based on a postseason game. The SWAC seems to acknowledge both schools' claims to the title in the conference's football media guide, although some other sources including Michael Hurd's Black College Football, 1892–1992: One Hundred Years of History, Education, and Pride (1993) also list Wiley as an additional co-champion, apparently since all three schools had 4-1 records against conference opponents if the postseason game is incorporated into the regular season conference standings.

Prairie View vacated its 1941 championship. No championship was awarded in 1943 due to World War II. Grambling State vacated its 1975 championship due to a violation of SWAC rules for scheduling opponents.

References

Bibliography
 

 
African Americans and sport
Recurring sporting events established in 1999